Tripterygion is a genus of fish in the family Tripterygiidae, the threefin blennies, the species of which are found in the north eastern Atlantic Ocean, the Mediterranean Sea and the Black Sea.

Species
 Tripterygion delaisi Cadenat & Blache, 1970 – black-faced blenny
 Tripterygion melanurus Guichenot, 1850
 Tripterygion tartessicum Carreras-Carbonell, Pascual & Macpherson, 2007
 Tripterygion tripteronotum (Risso, 1810) – red-black triplefin

Gallery

References

 
Tripterygiidae
Extant Miocene first appearances